Divided By is the debut studio album by Canadian metalcore band Structures, released on October 24, 2011, by Sumerian Records. It was produced by Will Putney and recorded at the Machine Shop in Belleville. It was the only album to feature vocalist Nick Xourafas and bassist Spencer MacLean.

Background and promotion
Their first and only single "Hydroplaning" preceded the album on October 4, 2011. A music video for their track "Paralyzed___" was released on July 10, 2012.

Between April and May 2012, the band played with Veil of Maya, Betraying the Martyrs and Vildhjarta on their first tour of Europe. In November, the band played in Europe again next to Parkway Drive, Emmure and The Word Alive. In May 2013, the band played another tour of Canada with Texas in July, Northlane and Intervals. Later that month they also performed an Australian and New Zealand tour, however their tour manager Alex Lidstone replaced Nick Xourafas, who was unable to attend due to passport issues.

The album was eventually released on October 24 and contains uncredited guest vocals from Despised Icon vocalist Alex Erian and Ion Dissonance vocalist Kevin McCaughey on the track "Clockwork", the track "Relapse; Signs." contained guest vocals from Frankie Palmeri of Emmure.

Critical reception

The album received mixed to favorable reviews. New Transcendence praised the album in a 4/5 review and said: "This album is heavy, in your face, features amazing guest vocalists, and the band is on a great label." David Keevill of Lamb Goat gave it 5/10, noting that it copies many popular metal and metalcore tropes, he also criticized the music production saying "the dreadful clipping and the levels that are amped up beyond belief are almost an album ruiner."

Track listing
Track listing adapted from Spotify.

Personnel
Credits retrieved from AllMusic.

Structures
 Nick Xourafas - unclean vocals
 Brendon Padjasek - lead guitar, unclean backing vocals
 Spyros Georgiou - rhythm guitar
 Spencer MacLean - bass guitar, clean vocals on tracks 2, 4-6, 9, and 10
 Andrew McEnaney - drums

Additional musicians
 Alex Erian - guest vocals on track 6
 Kevin McCaughey - guest vocals on track 6
 Frank Palmeri - guest vocals on track 7

Production
 Will Putney - engineering, mastering, mixing, producer
 Antoine Lussier - vocal engineer 
 Diego Farias 	vocal engineer 
 Jordan Valeriote - vocal engineer
 Jay Sakong - editing
 Alberto de Icaza - editing
 Daniel Wagner - art direction, design 
 Shawn Keith - A&R

Charts

References

2011 debut albums
Structures (band) albums
Sumerian Records albums
Albums produced by Will Putney